"Moonshine River" is the first episode of the twenty-fourth season of the American animated television series The Simpsons. It originally aired on the Fox network in the United States on September 30, 2012. In the UK and Ireland, the episode aired on Sky 1 on March 24, 2013, with 1,295,000 viewers, making it the second most watched program that week. The episode has ten guest stars, Ken Burns, Zooey Deschanel, Sarah Michelle Gellar, Anne Hathaway, Maurice LaMarche, Don Pardo, Natalie Portman, Kevin Michael Richardson, Al Roker and Sarah Silverman. Deschanel, Gellar, Hathaway, Portman and Silverman reprise their roles as Bart's previous love interests, Mary Spuckler (from "Apocalypse Cow"), Gina Vendetti (from "The Wandering Juvie"), Jenny (from "The Good, the Sad and the Drugly"), Darcy (from "Little Big Girl") and Nikki (from "Stealing First Base"), respectively. This is the second episode in which the Simpsons go to New York City, the first episode being "The City of New York vs. Homer Simpson".

The episode features references to the 1961 film Breakfast at Tiffany's. The title is a parody of that film's Academy Award-winning theme song, "Moon River".

Plot
A joint-celebration of the Springfield Grand Prix and the final stage of the Tour de Springfield turns sour when the race cars and bicyclists collide with each other. During the following Racers Ball, Bart observes Lisa dancing with Milhouse and makes fun of them, but then Lisa tells him in return that he will never have a date, as his relationships do not last more than a week because his girlfriends eventually find out "the real him". Bart realizes that Lisa is right and, hoping to prove her point wrong, visits all of his past girlfriends (including Jenny the nursing home volunteer from "The Good, the Sad, and the Drugly", Darcy the pregnant teen from "Little Big Girl", Gina Vendetti the juvenile delinquent from "The Wandering Juvie", and Nikki McKenna from "Stealing First Base") to see if they still like him, but each and every one of them rejects him while Nikki still oscillates between loving Bart and hating him.

Finally, Bart is left with one option: Mary Spuckler, the daughter of hillbilly Cletus Spuckler from "Apocalypse Cow". He and Milhouse visit the Spuckler house, but Cletus informs them that Mary ran away after he scheduled her for marriage with another hillbilly, and does not know where she is. However, Mary's brother Dubya tells Bart that Mary ran away to New York City and gives him her address. When Bart watches a video of him and Mary, he realizes that she might be his true love and asks Homer and Marge if they can go to New York. At first, the two refuse, still remembering the last time the family traveled to New York. However, Homer changes his mind and is able to find a way to get the family to New York: by swapping houses with a family from there (although the family is intentionally routed to the Flanders house).

Arriving at New York City, Bart and Homer search for Mary, and eventually find her at the address. Bart learns that Mary now works as a writer and has a performance option on Saturday Night Live. Mary and several citizens of New York sing a song for Bart, and the two realize that they truly love one another. Before they can kiss, Cletus arrives, having somehow found out where Mary is, and asks her to return home. Mary accepts, but while at the train station, she and Bart take advantage of Cletus's distraction to flee to another departing train. Mary tells Bart that there will be more Mary Spucklers out there, gives him their first kiss, and leaves on the train, calling out to not disappoint any of his future girlfriends and let them "fix him", as he has "a couple of problems, but is mostly great". The family and Cletus arrive, with Cletus demanding where Mary is heading for, but Bart, not wanting to ruin his last chance at true love, refuses. Cletus then accepts that he must let his daughter go. During the trip back to Springfield, Cletus comforts a saddened Bart (who cries) by giving him a photo of several of his children, including Mary, while Homer tells him that he learned the lesson on how "complicated" grown-up feelings can be.

As part of a subplot during the New York sequence, Marge, Lisa, and Maggie decide to search for culture. They first try to go to a Broadway show, but give up when they learn they can afford only the worst seats. Eventually arriving at a Shakespeare in the Park performance, they first experience complications when the line is extremely long. Then, the manager announces that the showing, Romeo and Juliet, will not be played tonight, as the actors portraying the Montague and Capulet families – the Baldwin and the Estevez brothers – are at a feud with one another. Enraged at this, Lisa enlists the audience members to take over the roles and they perform the play. However, the police arrive and break up the production. At the end of the episode, it is revealed that a review was written for the show, which Lisa is initially disgusted at, but is diverted when she finds out the reviewer liked her performance as Juliet. During the end credits, the family announces a contest for fans to submit their own couch gag, in which the winner's couch gag will be animated and appearing on the show, and that further details are to be shown on TheSimpsons.com.

Reception

Ratings
The episode earned a 3.8 adults 18–49 rating, on par with the previous season's premiere on September 25, 2011. The episode received 8.08 million viewers, making it the most watched show in the Animation Domination on FOX that night.

Critical reception
The episode received mixed reviews, with much of the criticism aimed at the anti-climax and cultural references.

Robert David Sullivan from The A.V. Club gave the episode a C−, commenting, "I have three criteria that a new episode can meet to be deemed watchable: Is there a coherent story? Does the episode make good use of the town of Springfield, one of the greatest mythological communities in all of fiction? And does the episode offer a smart take on some current cultural or political fad? To be clear, a 'yes' to just one of these questions would make the 508th or 509th episode worthwhile. 'Moonshine River' doesn't qualify on any count." However, he praised the couch gag, saying, "Much like the cold openings on The Office, the 'couch gags' that open The Simpsons are now consistently the most enjoyable part of the show. During the past couple of seasons, the extended opening scenes by guest animators Banksy and Bill Plympton were more talked-about than any episode itself. 'Moonshine River' opens with a cute, 40-second cartoon depicting the Simpsons as butterflies menaced by a mallet-wielding Baby Gerald (a.k.a. the Unibrow Baby)."

References

External links

"Moonshine River" at theSimpsons.com

2012 American television episodes
The Simpsons (season 24) episodes